Natrocarbonatite is a rare carbonatite lava which erupts from the Ol Doinyo Lengai volcano in Tanzania within the East African Rift of eastern Africa. Natrocarbonatite lavas were first documented in 1962, by J B Dawson.

Composition 
Whereas most lavas are rich in silicate minerals, the natrocarbonatite lavas of Ol Doinyo Lengai are rich in the rare sodium and potassium carbonate minerals, nyerereite and gregoryite.

Due to this unusual composition, the lava is erupted at relatively low temperatures (approximately 500-600 °C). This temperature is so low that the molten lava appears black in sunlight, rather than having the red glow common to most lavas. It is also much more fluid than silicate lavas.

Impact 
The sodium and potassium carbonate minerals of the lavas erupted at Ol Doinyo Lengai are unstable at the Earth's surface and susceptible to rapid weathering, the minerals are anhydrous and when they come into contact with the moisture of the atmosphere, they begin to react extremely quickly.

The black or dark brown lava and ash erupted begins to turn white within a few hours. The resulting volcanic landscape is different from any other in the world.

In popular culture 

Notable appearances
 Etnatao: Ol Doinyo Lengai Volcano Tanzania 
 Eruption
 Ol Doinyo Lengai Volcano HDTV (from  a French TV documentary)

References

World's Coolest Lava is in Africa, 2003, USGS, Hawaii Volcano Observatory
OL DOINYO LENGAI - THE MOUNTAIN OF GOD

Volcanology
Volcanic rocks